Patrick John McNamara (born Melbourne, 11 August 1949) is a former Australian politician who was a member of the Victorian Legislative Assembly, representing Benalla for the National Party from 1982 to 2000. From 1988 to 1999, he was leader of the National Party in Victoria and was Deputy Premier of Victoria under Jeff Kennett from 1992 to 1999.  He held several ministerial positions in the Kennett government, including Minister for Agriculture and Resources, Minister for Tourism, Minister for Police and Emergency Services and Minister for Corrections.  During his tenure as Deputy Premier, Kennett's Liberals actually held a majority in their own right.  Although Kennett did not need the support of McNamara's Nationals, the coalition was retained.

Following the defeat of the Liberal-National coalition at the 1999 Victorian election, McNamara resigned the party leadership. A year later, he resigned from parliament, triggering a by-election which resulted in the Nationals losing the seat to the Labor Party.

References

1949 births
Living people
Delegates to the Australian Constitutional Convention 1998
20th-century Australian politicians
Members of the Victorian Legislative Assembly
National Party of Australia members of the Parliament of Victoria
Deputy Premiers of Victoria
RMIT University alumni
People educated at Xavier College
Politicians from Melbourne
Victorian Ministers for Agriculture